Sialic acid-binding Ig-like lectin 8 is a protein that in humans is encoded by the SIGLEC8 gene. This gene is located on chromosome 19q13.4, about 330 kb downstream of the SIGLEC9 gene. Within the siglec family of transmembrane proteins, Siglec-8 belongs to the CD33-related siglec subfamily, a subfamily that has undergone rapid evolution.

Initial characterization

Siglec-8 was first identified by CD33 homology screening of ESTs from a cDNA library generated from a patient diagnosed with idiopathic hypereosinophilic syndrome and was originally termed SAF-2 (sialoadhesin family 2).
At the tissue level, Siglec-8 mRNA was found to be most highly expressed in lung, PBMCs, spleen, and kidney.

Expression

Siglec-8 is expressed by human eosinophils, mast cells, and, to a lesser extent, basophils. It has thus garnered attention as a molecule that is uniquely expressed by immune effector cells involved in asthma and allergy. In both eosinophils and mast cells, Siglec-8 is expressed late in development. Siglec-8 transcript and protein are detectable at day 12 during the in vitro differentiation of eosinophils from cord blood precursors, whereas the transcription factor GATA-1 peaks at day 2 and the secondary granule protein MBP-1 peaks at day 4 in this differentiation system. In mast cells generated from CD34+ precursors, Siglec-8 expression peaks at 4 weeks of differentiation, in parallel with FcεRIα surface expression.

Consistent with the concept that Siglec-8 is a late differentiation marker, Siglec-8 has not been detected on the surface of relatively undifferentiated eosinophilic cell lines, such as EoL-1, AML14, AML14.3D10, or K562, the basophilic leukemia cell line KU812, nor on cells such as HL60 or EoL-3 that have been differentiated towards an eosinophil-like lineage. Only low levels are detected on the human mast cell sub-line HMC-1.1; however, the HMC-1.2 cell line, which bears a second KIT mutation (D816V, in addition to the V560G mutation found in both HMC-1.1 and HMC-1.2 cells) that may induce further differentiation, expresses Siglec-8 at the cell surface. However, based on a small sampling of patients, all eosinophils from patients with chronic eosinophilic leukemia (CEL), hypereosinophilic syndrome, or chronic myeloid leukemia (CML), all basophils from patients with CEL or CML, and all bone marrow mast cells from patients with indolent systemic mastocytosis or aplastic anemia express Siglec-8, providing a potential target for these cells in the context of these hematologic malignancies.

In addition, baboon eosinophils as well as monocytes, a subset of lymphocytes, and neutrophils express on their cell surface a protein or proteins that are recognized by polyclonal human Siglec-8-specific antibody, consistent with genetic analyses indicating the existence of a Siglec-8 ortholog in this species. However, the 2C4, 2E2, and 7C9 monoclonal antibodies against human Siglec-8 were not found to bind to targets on baboon cells, indicating that these particular epitopes are not conserved.

Structure

Two splice variants of Siglec-8 exist. The initially characterized form contains 431 amino acid residues in total, 47 of which comprise an uncharacteristically short cytoplasmic tail compared to most CD33-associated siglecs. Subsequently, a longer form of Siglec-8, initially termed Siglec-8L, that contains 499 amino acid residues was identified. This longer form of Siglec-8 shares the same extracellular region but includes a longer cytoplasmic tail with two tyrosine-based motifs (an immunoreceptor tyrosine-based inhibitory motif [ITIM] and an immunoreceptor tyrosine-based switch motif [ITSM]). Both forms of Siglec-8 are found in eosinophils and contain a V-set domain with lectin activity and two C2-type Ig repeat domains in the extracellular region. Given that the longer version is felt to be the normal version, the term Siglec-8 is best used to refer to the 499 amino acid version, while the 431 amino acid version is best referred to as the “short form” of Siglec-8.

Ligand binding

Potential glycan ligands for Siglec-8 have been screened by glycan array. The glycan NeuAcα2–3(6-O-sulfo)Galβ1–4[Fucα1–3]GlcNAc, also known as 6′-sulfo-sialyl Lewis X, binds with high affinity to both Siglec-8 and to a mouse siglec, Siglec-F, which appears to have acquired a similar but not identical function and pattern of expression to human Siglec-8 through convergent evolution (the two siglecs are not orthologous). Rescreening on a more expanded glycan array reconfirmed this finding, but also identified a second closely related ligand in which the fucose is absent (NeuAcα2–3(6-O-sulfo)Galβ1–4GlcNAc, or 6′-sulfated sialyl N-acetyl-D-lactosamine. These interactions are quite specific; no binding could be detected between these siglecs and unsulfated sialyl Lewis X or sialyl Lewis X sulfated at carbon 6 of GlcNAc (6-sulfo-sialyl Lewis X) rather than carbon 6 of galactose as in 6′-sulfo-sialyl Lewis X. Similarly, no other siglecs bind effectively to these Siglec-8 ligands, as demonstrated by selective binding to eosinophils in human blood of a polymer decorated with 6′-sulfo-sialyl Lewis X. The natural ligand or ligands for Siglec-8 have not yet been positively identified, but ongoing studies have determined that there are sialidase-sensitive glycoprotein ligands for Siglec-F in mouse airways that require the activity of the α2,3 sialyltransferase 3 (ST3Gal-III) enzyme for their generation. There is also evidence that Siglec-8 on eosinophils interacts with sialylated cis ligands. Treatment of human eosinophils with sialidase increases the extent to which a high-avidity glycan ligand (1-MDa polyacrylamide ribbon decorated with 6′-O-sulfo-3′-sialyl-LacNAc) binds to these cells by about 50%. The precise identity of the glycan ligand to which Siglec-8 binds in cis has not been determined.

Signaling and function

Eosinophils

Consistent with the role of most siglecs and the presence of the intracellular ITIM, Siglec-8 has been found to function as an inhibitory immunoregulatory receptor. Ligation of Siglec-8 induces cell death in eosinophils, and, surprisingly, the normally pro-survival cytokines interleukin (IL)-5 and GM-CSF have been found to potentiate this cell death effect. IL-33, which activates and maintains eosinophils, also exerts a similar potentiating effect on Siglec-8-induced cell death. Inhibitor studies demonstrate that cell death induced by crosslinking Siglec-8 through the use of an anti-Siglec-8 mAb and a secondary antibody is mediated sequentially through reactive oxygen species (ROS) production, loss of mitochondrial membrane potential, and caspase activation. In the presence of IL-5, the loss of mitochondrial membrane integrity is accelerated and the secondary crosslinking antibody is no longer necessary to induce cell death. IL-5 stimulation also appears to alter the mode of cell death of eosinophils induced by Siglec-8 ligation in that cell death becomes a caspase-independent process. On IL-5-primed eosinophils, antibody ligation of Siglec-8 was found to lead to CD11b/CD18 integrin upregulation, conformational activation, and subsequent integrin-mediated adhesion. Disruption of integrin-mediated adhesion with antibodies to CD18 prevented Siglec-8-induced ROS production and cell death, indicating that β2 integrins act as essential mediators in the Siglec-8 ligation-induced cell death process in eosinophils. The signaling cascade leading to CD11b/CD18 integrin upregulation and conformational activation was elucidated using pharmacologic inhibition of key signaling molecules combined with analyses of cellular events leading to cell death. This signaling pathway is atypical for an ITIM-bearing siglec and involves the activities of a Src family kinase, Syk, PI3K, phospholipase C, protein kinase C, Rac1, PAK1, MEK1, and ERK1/2. The conformational activation of CD11b was dependent on the activity of Bruton's tyrosine kinase. There was no evidence supporting the involvement of protein tyrosine phosphatases typically associated with ITIM-mediated signaling pathways, such as SHP-1/2, in this pathway. 

Concurrent stimulation of the IL-5 receptor and Siglec-8 leads to a type of cell death resembling regulated necrosis that is promoted by MEK1/ERK signaling. In this experimental system, inhibition of MEK1 does not alter ROS generation but the ROS inhibitor diphenyleneiodonium inhibits ERK1/2 phosphorylation and cell death, leading to the conclusion that the production of ROS is upstream of MEK1/ERK signaling in this pathway. However, in eosinophils that had been primed with IL-5 18–24 h prior to Siglec-8 ligation, the activities of MEK1 and ERK1/2 are necessary prior to integrin upregulation and ROS production. Cell death induced by Siglec-8 in the presence of IL-33, in contrast, is mediated primarily by a caspase-dependent pathway, and IL-33 is capable of synergizing with IL-5 in potentiating cell death induced by Siglec-8 ligation. 

Siglec-8 undergoes endocytosis upon antibody ligation on eosinophils and mast cells. This process is dependent on the cytoplasmic ITIM (and not the ITSM), the activities of tyrosine kinases and protein kinase C, and actin rearrangement. Furthermore, it can be exploited to deliver toxins to human eosinophils or mast cells to selectively induce cell death when Siglec-8 ligation by itself would not be sufficient to do so (e.g., on mast cells or unprimed eosinophils).

Mast cells and basophils

While Siglec-8 ligation does not cause mast cell apoptosis, it inhibits FcεRIα-mediated Ca2+ flux and release of prostaglandin D2 and histamine. However, the release of IL-8 is not prevented by Siglec-8 ligation in mast cells. In experiments using the rat basophilic leukemia cell line RBL-2H3 stably transfected with Siglec-8, the inhibitory effect of Siglec-8 ligation on FcεRIα-mediated degranulation and Ca2+ flux was found to be dependent on the intact ITIM. There are no published data regarding the function of Siglec-8 on basophils.

Relationships with other siglecs

CD33-related siglec subfamily

Due to its high level of sequence homology with CD33 (Siglec-3), Siglec-8 is grouped within the CD33-related siglec subfamily. This family is composed of a rapidly evolving group of siglecs that share 50–99% sequence identity. Most members of the subfamily also possess conserved cytoplasmic ITIM and ITIM-like sequences.

Mouse Siglec-F

While SIGLEC8 and mouse Siglecf  do not appear to derive from the same ancestral gene (they are paralogous, not orthologous), they share a binding preference for 6′-sulfo-sialyl Lewis X and 6′-sulfated sialyl N-acetyl-D-lactosamine, similar but distinct patterns of cellular expression, and similar inhibitory functions. For example, Siglec-F is expressed by eosinophils, like Siglec-8, but is also expressed by alveolar macrophages and has not been detected on mouse mast cells or basophils. This functional convergence of Siglec-8 and Siglec-F has permitted in vivo studies to be performed in mouse models of eosinophil-mediated disorders that may provide information about the human system. In a chicken ovalbumin (OVA) model of allergic airway inflammation, the Siglec-F knockout mouse exhibits increased lung eosinophilia, enhanced inflammation, delayed resolution, and exacerbated peribronchial fibrosis. Antibody ligation of Siglec-F has also been shown to inhibit eosinophil-mediated intestinal inflammation and airway remodeling in OVA challenge models. The ST3Gal-III enzyme is necessary for the generation of the natural Siglec-F ligand, which remains unknown but is induced by IL-4 and IL-13 in the airway. Loss of this enzyme leads to enhanced allergic eosinophilic airway inflammation. Despite evidence that Siglec-F binds specifically to 6′-sulfo-sialyl Lewis X and 6′-sulfated sialyl N-acetyl-D-lactosamine, in which galactose is sulfated at carbon 6, mice deficient in the two known galactose 6-O-sulfotransferases, keratan sulfate galactose 6-O-sulfotransferase (KSGal6ST) and chondroitin 6-O-sulfotransferase 1 (C6ST-1), express equivalent levels of Siglec-F ligand. These models may shed some light on the regulation of human eosinophil biology by Siglec-8 and the production of natural Siglec-8 ligands in humans. Also like Siglec-8, Siglec-F ligation leads to the apoptosis of eosinophils. However, Siglec-F–induced eosinophil apoptosis is mediated by a mechanism distinct from that employed by Siglec-8, hindering direct comparisons between the mouse and human systems. Siglec-F-induced apoptosis is mediated by caspase activation in mouse eosinophils and does not involve ROS, in contrast to the mechanism reported in Siglec-8–induced apoptosis of human eosinophils. This apoptotic mechanism also does not involve Src family kinases, SHP-1, or NADPH.

Research
In a randomized clinical trial, lirentelimab, a monoclonal antibody targeting SIGLEC8 has been evaluated as a treatment for eosinophilic gastritis and duodenitis.

References

Further reading

External links 
 

Clusters of differentiation
SIGLEC